The men's 200 metre butterfly event at the 2020 Summer Olympics was held in 2021 at the Tokyo Aquatics Centre. It was the event's seventeenth consecutive appearance, having been held at every edition since 1956.

Records
Prior to this competition, the existing world and Olympic records were as follows.

The following record was established during the competition:

Qualification

 
The Olympic Qualifying Time for the event is 1:56.48. Up to two swimmers per National Olympic Committee (NOC) can automatically qualify by swimming that time at an approved qualification event. The Olympic Selection Time is 1:59.97. Up to one swimmer per NOC meeting that time is eligible for selection, allocated by world ranking until the maximum quota for all swimming events is reached. NOCs without a male swimmer qualified in any event can also use their universality place.

Indian Swimmer, Sajan Prakash failed to qualify in the 200m butterfly event.

Competition format

The competition consists of three rounds: heats, semifinals, and a final. The swimmers with the best 16 times in the heats advance to the semifinals. The swimmers with the best 8 times in the semifinals advance to the final. Swim-offs are used as necessary to break ties for advancement to the next round.

Schedule
All times are Japan standard time (UTC+9)

Results

Heats
The swimmers with the top 16 times, regardless of heat, advance to the semifinals.

Semifinals

The swimmers with the best 8 times, regardless of heat, advanced to the final.

Final

References

Men's 00200 metre butterfly
Olympics
Men's events at the 2020 Summer Olympics